Tiina Saario (born 15 January 1982) is a Finnish football midfielder. She plays club football for MPS in the Finnish second tier Naisten Ykkönen.

Club career
In 2002 Saario went to Barry University to study criminology and play for the varsity soccer team. She turned out for Springfield Sirens in the 2001 W-League season.

After university Saario drifted away from football, but eventually started playing again for smaller clubs KontU and Veto. She agreed to join Naisten Liiga HJK Helsinki in 2010.

In the 2010 Finnish Women's Cup final, Saario suffered a serious head injury in which her jaw was broken and she lost several teeth. Åland United signed her ahead of the 2013 season. In June 2014 it was announced that Saario will rejoin Åland for the qualifying round of the 2014–15 UEFA Women's Champions League.

International career
Saario made her debut for the Finland women's national football team in February 1999, having turned 17 the previous month. She played 90 minutes of a 3–1 defeat to the United States in Orlando, Florida. At the 1999 Algarve Cup Saario made two further appearances, but did not play for her country again until April 2002; a 3–0 defeat to the United States in San Jose, California.

Saario remained on four national team caps until February 2012, when she returned to the team for a friendly with Russia after an absence of almost 10 years. In June 2013 Saario was named in national coach Andrée Jeglertz's Finland squad for UEFA Women's Euro 2013.

Honours

Club
Åland United
Finnish League: 2013
HJK Helsinki
Winner
 Finnish Women's Cup: 2010
 Liiga Cup Naiset: 2011, 2012

References

External links
 
 Profile at fussballtransfers.com
 
 

1982 births
Living people
Finnish women's footballers
Finnish expatriate footballers
Finnish expatriate sportspeople in the United States
Finland women's international footballers
Kansallinen Liiga players
Åland United players
Helsingin Jalkapalloklubi (women) players
Barry Buccaneers women's soccer players
Expatriate women's soccer players in the United States
USL W-League (1995–2015) players
FC Viikingit players
FC Kontu players
Women's association football midfielders
Footballers from Helsinki